Steven Haberman (born 26 June 1951) is Director and Deputy Dean in Cass Business School, Professor of Actuarial Science in its Faculty of Actuarial Science and Insurance and is Founding Editor of the Journal of Pension, Economics and Finance.

He was educated at Ilford County High School, Trinity College, Cambridge (MA) and City University (PhD, DSc).

Career
Prudential Assurance Company, 1972–74
Government Actuary's Department, 1977–97
City University: lecturer, Department of Actuarial Science 1974–79, senior lecturer 1979–83, reader 1983–85, professor 1985–, dean School of Mathematics 1995–2002
Deputy dean, Cass Business School 2002–

See also
List of British Jewish scientists

References

External links
http://www.cass.city.ac.uk/intranet/staff/deans-office/shaberman  Web site
http://bunhill.city.ac.uk/research/cassexperts.nsf/(smarturl)/s.haberman
https://web.archive.org/web/20060620223324/http://www.staff.city.ac.uk/s.haberman/images/steve_haberman.jpg  Photo

1951 births
Living people
20th-century English mathematicians
Alumni of Trinity College, Cambridge
Alumni of City, University of London
Academics of City, University of London
Academics of Bayes Business School
English Jews
Jewish scientists
British actuaries
People educated at Ilford County High School
People from Ilford